Boovie is a 1998 Czech puzzle video game by Future Games for MS-DOS released in early 1998. It came out on CD-ROM in January 1999. It is based on two games: Boovie (1994) and Boovie 2 (1998) for ZX Spectrum from the same authors.

Gameplay 
The player controls Boovie, and must push a bright brick into a teleporter to progress to the next level. The game has 20 to 40 levels, depending on the selected difficulty.

Development 
Boovie is a remake of the game of the same name, which the authors programmed in 1994 for the ZX Spectrum. It's a game inspired by Flappy (1983). After the game, the developers had long tried to create a second part in spring 1999. None of the authors however didn't last long and the project died. The game has been translated into English.

Reception 
The game is Bonusweb's favourite from Future Games, who noted similarities between Boovie and another game from the studio named Bloodie.

See also
 Video games in the Czech Republic

References 

1998 video games
DOS games
Puzzle video games
Video games developed in the Czech Republic
Europe-exclusive video games